Film i Väst (English: "Film in West") is a film company located in Trollhättan, Sweden, nicknamed "Trollywood"), founded in 1992  by the Älvsborg County Council. Lars von Trier used its facilities in his movies, such as Dogville and Manderlay. Film i Väst became known early on under the nickname Trollywood (from Trollhättan + Hollywood). Since its inception, Film i Väst has co-produced a total of more than 1,000 Swedish and international feature films, TV dramas, documentaries and short films.

Walk of Fame

Trollhättan has a small Walk of Fame, featuring stars of the movie industry who worked in Film i Väst productions.

Selected productions

References

External links
Official homepage

1992 establishments in Sweden
Swedish film studios
Film production companies of Sweden